Lifesaving is an official discipline of the World Games, the Games with all the sports, recognized by the IOC but not yet in the Olympic program.

Beach Flags
Beach Flags (sport)

A series of flags are inserted into the sand, in a row. The number of the flags are less than a number of competitors.  As the game progressed one flag is removed from the ground. Competitors stand on the finish line facing down position before the race starts. The winner is the person who grabs a flag 20 yards away. The races has the freedom to choose any flags.  It is prohibited that any players obstruct the other competitors.  If any player rise before the starter starts that a disqualification.  A player who holds a flag is eliminated.  With only two players remaining the last player to touch the flag is the winner.

Ball Relay

A game of Ball Relay

 Line up the four teams from the starting line to the finish line. Space the teams out so they have to toss the ball between them.
 At the signal each team begins throwing and catching the ball to see which team can have their ball pass the line first.

History
The sport can be played indoors in swimming pools or outside on beaches, in the same way that you get pool lifeguards and beach lifeguards. Life saving sport is one of few sports that has a humanitarian purpose: to train better life savers and life guards.

The ILS advises that 'lifesaving sport was primarily intended to encourage lifesavers to develop, maintain and improve the essential physical and mental skills needed to save lives in the aquatic environment.'  The sport consists of a series of competition disciplines intended 'to further develop and demonstrate lifesaving skills, fitness and motivation'.

The World Governing body for life saving sport is the ILS. Each nation within has a national governing body. In some nations (including the United Kingdom, Australia and New Zealand) there are numerous governing bodies affiliated to the ILS. This is often due to various components of life saving within a nation being focused on by separate organisations. (e.g. Royal Life Saving Society focusing mainly on pool safety and Surf Life Saving Association focusing on beach safety.)  Every two years the ILS organises the Lifesaving World Championships, called 'Rescue' Series.

Competitive lifesaving is carried out widely in the UK, with clubs including Leeds Phoenix Lifesaving, Belfast Olympia Lifesaving club, Blyth Lifesaving club and Crawley Town LSC. Competitions at university level are organised through BULSCA.  Lifesaving has progressed significantly becoming a modern and widely known sport and occupation.

Lifesaving is an official discipline of the World Games, the Games with all the sports, recognized by the IOC but not yet in the Olympic program.

Governing body

The International Life Saving Federation (ILS) was established on 27 March 1910 in Paris, France. The ILS is primarily known as the world authority and head in the global effort to "prevent drowning and regroups national life saving organisations/federations aiming at improving water safety, water rescue, lifesaving and lifeguarding and lifesaving sport"

Competitions
 World Life Saving Championships
 Lifesaving at the World Games

See also
 Lifesaving
 Surf lifesaving
 List of world records in lifesaving

References

External links
 Lifesaving World Championships 2020
 International Life Saving Federation (ILS)